Transpoint Oy Ab is a Finnish freight logistics company. It is owned by VR Group (Finnish Railways) and is part of VR's Pohjolan Liikenne road services division. Transpoint trucks can be seen throughout Finland; trailer units are often carried around Finland by train.

See also
Osakeyhtiö (=Oy, Finnish limited company)

External links
Official website (in Finnish, Swedish and English)

Transport companies of Finland
Logistics companies of Finland